Kyle Jordan Hudson (born January 7, 1987) is an American former professional baseball outfielder who played in Major League Baseball (MLB) for the Baltimore Orioles in 2011. Hudson is currently the first base and outfield coach for the Boston Red Sox.

Playing career

Amateur career
Hudson played college baseball and college football at the University of Illinois at Urbana–Champaign. He started at wide receiver for the Fighting Illini from 2005–2007.

Baltimore Orioles
Hudson was drafted by the Baltimore Orioles in the fourth round of the 2008 Major League Baseball Draft.

Hudson was called up to the majors for the first time on September 1, 2011.

Hudson was released by the Orioles as of January 17, 2012.

Later career
On January 28, 2012, he signed a minor league contract with the Texas Rangers. He also received an invitation to spring training. On March 31, 2012, Hudson was traded to the Tampa Bay Rays for future considerations.

In May 2012, Hudson was traded to the Philadelphia Phillies for Rich Thompson. Hudson signed a minor league deal with the Los Angeles Angels of Anaheim in December 2013. On January 22, 2014, he was assigned to AAA Salt Lake Bees. On March 27, 2014, he was demoted to AA Arkansas Travelers. He was released by the Los Angeles Angels of Anaheim on July 2, 2014.

Hudson agreed to a job as a volunteer assistant as the University of Illinois in January 2015 though he later, on June 13, 2015, signed a minor league contract with the Los Angeles Dodgers. He appeared in nine games for the Class-A Rancho Cucamonga Quakes, exclusively as a pinch runner and was released on August 12.

Coaching career
Hudson served as bench coach for the Columbus Clippers, the Triple-A affiliate of the Cleveland Indians, in 2019. Hudson was promoted to the Indians' major league coaching staff for the 2020 season, serving as staff assistant. On January 4, 2023, Hudson was named the first base coach and outfield instructor for the Boston Red Sox.

References

External links

Illinois Fighting Illini bio

1987 births
Living people
Aberdeen IronBirds players
Arizona League Dodgers players
Arkansas Travelers players
American football wide receivers
Baltimore Orioles players
Baseball coaches from Illinois
Baseball players from Illinois
Boston Red Sox coaches
Bowie Baysox players
Delmarva Shorebirds players
Durham Bulls players
Frederick Keys players
Illinois Fighting Illini baseball players
Illinois Fighting Illini football players
Lehigh Valley IronPigs players
Major League Baseball first base coaches
Major League Baseball outfielders
Norfolk Tides players
People from Mattoon, Illinois
Rancho Cucamonga Quakes players